Geritola is a genus of butterflies in the family Lycaenidae. The species of this genus are endemic to the Afrotropical realm.

Species
Subgenus Geritola Libert, 1999
Geritola albomaculata (Bethune-Baker, 1903)
Geritola amieti Libert, 1999
Geritola concepcion (Suffert, 1904)
Geritola cyanea (Jackson, 1964)
Geritola daveyi (Roche, 1954)
Geritola dubia (Jackson, 1964)
Geritola frankdaveyi Libert, 1999
Geritola gerina (Hewitson, 1878)
Geritola goodii (Holland, 1890)
Geritola jackiana Collins & Libert, 1999
Geritola larae Collins & Libert, 1999
Geritola liana (Roche, 1954)
Geritola mirifica (Jackson, 1964)
Geritola nitide (Druce, 1910)
Geritola nitidica Libert & Collins, 1999
Geritola prouvosti Bouyer & Libert, 1999
Geritola virginea (Bethune-Baker, 1904)
Geritola zelica (Kirby, 1890)
Subgenus Argyrotola Libert, 1999
Geritola subargentea (Jackson, 1964)

External links
"Geritola Libert, 1999" at Markku Savela's Lepidoptera and some other life forms
 Seitz, A. Die Gross-Schmetterlinge der Erde 13: Die Afrikanischen Tagfalter. Plate XIII 65

Poritiinae
Butterfly genera